Roar Strand (born 2 February 1970) is a Norwegian former professional footballer who played as a midfielder, mostly for Rosenborg. Strand was capped 42 times for the Norway national team. He is the player with the fourth-highest number of appearances in the Norwegian top division. He has won 16 league titles, more than any other player in history and the Norwegian Football Cup five times, and he has scored goals in 21 consecutive top flight seasons.

Club career
Strand was born in Trondheim and played for Rosenborg his whole career, except for the 1993 season when he was loaned out to Molde FK, from he made his debut in 1989 till he retired in 2010. He mostly played as midfielder but as an allrounder he also played as winger and wingback.

Strand won the Norwegian top division 16 times (11 consecutive) as well as the Norwegian Football Cup five times with Rosenborg. He participated in the UEFA Champions League 11 times with Rosenborg and played 71 Champions League matches and 100 matches including the qualification matches. He is third on the list of most appearances in the Norwegian Premier Division.

He is looked upon as a hero among supporters of Rosenborg because he has always been loyal to the club without having played abroad where the salaries are higher. He is also highly respected among both players and fans of other Norwegian clubs. The number 6 jersey he used in Rosenborg was retired in his honor. This is the only time Rosenborg has retired a jersey number.

Roar Strand has played over 400 matches in the Norwegian Tippeliga. Match number 400 was against HamKam on Sunday 21 September 2008. Sunday 19 April 2009 he played match number 600 for Rosenborg BK. That includes Norwegian top division, Norwegian Cup, European cups and Royal League.

Strand shares a European record with Manchester United's Ryan Giggs of scoring in 21 consecutive top flight seasons. That equals Pelé, but is behind Romario, who scored in 23 consecutive seasons.

Strand is one of only 19 players in Champions League history to have made 100 or more appearances in the competition for the same club.

International career
Strand played for various youth teams between 1986 and 1989 before he was called up to the Norway U21 national team in 1990, where he played ten games and scored six goals.

In 1994, he was called up to the senior national team's squad for the 1994 World Cup in the United States, but he did not play. His debut came on 5 June in a 2–0 loss against Sweden in the preparation for the World Cup.

Strand played in the 1998 World Cup in France and in the 2000 European Football Championship in Belgium and the Netherlands. He retired from the national team in 2003, despite pressure for him to carry on.

He played 42 games and scored four goals for Norway.

Career statistics

Honours
Rosenborg
Norwegian top division (16): 1990, 1992, 1994, 1995, 1996, 1997, 1998, 1999, 2000, 2001, 2002, 2003, 2004, 2006, 2009, 2010
Norwegian Cup: 1990, 1992, 1995, 1999, 2003

Individual
Kniksen award as midfielder of the year in 1998
Kniksen's Honorary Award in 2001
Norwegian Football Association Gold Watch

References

1970 births
Living people
Sportspeople from Trondheim
Norwegian footballers
Rosenborg BK players
Molde FK players
Eliteserien players
Kniksen Award winners
Norway international footballers
Norway youth international footballers
1994 FIFA World Cup players
1998 FIFA World Cup players
UEFA Euro 2000 players
Association football midfielders